Hugh McHugh Breifne O'Conor (Irish: Aedh mac Aedh Breifneach Ua Conchobair) was king of Connacht, Ireland, in 1342. He was the last of the Clan Murtagh O'Conor to hold this position. He died in 1350, as the O'Connor Breifne (Ó Conchobar Brefnech), some eight years after being expelled. His father, a son of Cathal O'Connor had briefly made a bid for the kingship in 1309-10 from a power-base established in Breifne O'Rourke.

References

 Byrne, Francis John (2001), Irish Kings and High-Kings, Dublin: Four Courts Press, 
 Gaelic and Gaelised Ireland, Kenneth Nicols, 1972.
 The Second Battle of Athenry, Adrian James Martyn, East Galway News & Views, 2008 – 2009

Kings of Connacht
1350 deaths
People from County Roscommon
14th-century Irish monarchs
Hugh McHugh Breifne
Year of birth unknown